Aditya Dhar (born 12 March 1983) is an Indian filmmaker and lyricist, best known for directing and writing military action film Uri: The Surgical Strike (2019).

Early life and career

Dhar was born on 12 March 1983 in New Delhi, India. He married Yami Gautam Dhar on 4 June 2021. Dhar is a Kashmiri Pandit.

In 2019, Dhar made his directorial debut with Uri: The Surgical Strike, an action film based on the 2016 Uri attack, starring Vicky Kaushal, Yami Gautam and Paresh Rawal in pivotal roles and produced by Ronnie Screwvala under the RSVP Movies banner. Filmed in Serbia, the film is fictionally dramatised account of the true events of the retaliation to the 2016 Uri attack. Uri earned  in India, and over  worldwide, making it the tenth highest-grossing Indian film domestically. Dhar was awarded with the National Film Award for Best Director and the Filmfare Award for Best Debut Director. 

Dhar launched his own production company named Aditya Dhar Films in 2021. He is set to re-team with Kaushal in the mythological based superhero movie The Immortal Ashwatthama co-starring Sara Ali Khan. It is a planned trilogy backed by Ronnie Screwvala. The film was announced on the second anniversary of the release of Uri and was set to start filming in mid-2021 but was delayed due to the COVID-19 pandemic in India and budget concerns.

Filmography

Awards and nominations

References

External links

 
 
 
 

1983 births
Living people
21st-century Indian film directors
Film directors from Delhi
Hindi-language film directors
Hindi screenwriters
Hindi-language lyricists
Best Director National Film Award winners
International Indian Film Academy Awards winners
Filmfare Awards winners